Anastasiadis is a Greek surname. Notable people with the surname include:

Anestis Anastasiadis (born 1983) Greek footballer
Angelos Anastasiadis (born 1953) Greek football manager
Dean Anastasiadis (born 1970) Australian football coach, brother of John
John Anastasiadis (born 1968) Australian football manager, brother of Dean
Nikos Anastasiadis (born 1946) 7th and current (2013-) President of Cyprus
Themos Anastasiadis (born 1958) Greek Journalist

Greek-language surnames